The minister of official languages is a minister of the Crown in the Canadian Cabinet.  

The minister is responsible for administering Official Languages Act, ensuring that government services are available in both English and French, protecting minority language rights, particularly in the area of education, as well as promoting bilingualism throughout Canada. 

Ginette Petitpas Taylor has served as the minister of official languages since October 26, 2021. She concurrently serves as minister responsible for the Atlantic Canada Opportunities Agency.

Background 
In 2003, the first minister responsible for Official Languages was sworn in, on the creation of the "Official Languages Branch of Intergovernmental Affairs" within the Privy Council Office. In 2006, responsibility was shifted from the Privy Council Office to the Department of Canadian Heritage, and the branch was renamed the "Official Languages Secretariat". From 2015 to 2019, the post was called Minister of Tourism, Official Languages and La Francophonie. 

Sections 42 and 43 of the Official Languages Act give the minister of Canadian heritage the specific responsibility of taking measures to advance the equality of status and use of English and French in Canadian society; under section 44 of that Act, the minister must submit annual reports to Parliament on the matters relating to official languages for which the minister is responsible.

List of Ministers

See also
Department of Canadian Heritage
Official bilingualism in Canada
Official Languages Act (Canada)
Minister of Canadian Heritage

References

Official Languages
Bilingualism in Canada
Department of Canadian Heritage